Argyle, an electoral district of the Legislative Assembly in the Australian state of New South Wales, has existed from the establishment of the Legislative Assembly in 1855 until the district's abolition in 1904.


Election results

1901

1898

1895

1894

1891

1889

1887

1885

1885 by-election

1882

1881 by-election

1880

1877

1874

1872

1869

1864

1862 by-election

1860

1859

1858

1857 by-election

1856

References

New South Wales state electoral results by district